Loschwitz Bridge is a cantilever truss bridge over the river Elbe in Dresden the capital of  Saxony in Germany. It connects the city districts of Blasewitz and Loschwitz, two affluent residential areas, which around 1900 were amongst the most expensive in Europe. It is located close to Standseilbahn Dresden funicular railway and the world's oldest suspension railway Schwebebahn Dresden, as well as near the Dresden TV tower. The bridge is colloquially referred to as Blaues Wunder ("Blue Wonder"). This common name purportedly referred to the bridge's original blue colour and being seen as a technological miracle at the time; it is also understood to carry the cynical connotation referencing the German idiom  meaning "to experience an unpleasant surprise" (literally:  "to experience a blue wonder"), reflecting the skeptical view of contemporary commentators.  There is also a bridge in Wolgast known as Blaues Wunder.

Construction took two years and was completed in 1893 at a cost of 2.25 million Goldmarks (equivalent to  million  €) and named  in honor of King Albert of Saxony. In the 19th century, a bridge of this length without supporting river piers was considered a technological masterpiece. Today the technology is less miraculous, but the bridge is a much-loved symbol of the city.

The original bridge toll ended during the hyperinflation of 1923. Towards the end of World War II, an SS unit attempted to destroy the bridge, but this was prevented when two people cut the detonator wires.  Preserved in its original construction, the advanced age of the structure in recent years has led to some traffic limits. Until the opening of the Waldschlösschen Bridge on 26 August 2013, it was the only Elbe crossing east of the city centre.

See also
 List of bridges in Germany

References

External links 

 

Cantilever bridges
Bridges completed in 1893
Buildings and structures in Dresden
Tourist attractions in Dresden
Road bridges in Germany
Former toll bridges in Germany